The 2004 Heineken Cup Final was the final match of the 2003–04 Heineken Cup, the ninth season of Europe's top club rugby union competition. The match was played on 23 May 2004 at Twickenham Stadium in London. The match was contested by London Wasps of England and Toulouse of France. Wasps won the match 27–20.

Match details

See also
2003–04 Heineken Cup

References

Final
2004
Heineken Cup Final
Hein
Heineken Cup Final 2004
Stade Toulousain matches
Wasps RFC matches